Shulamit "Shuli" Natan ( (born March 16, 1947)  is an Israeli singer. She is best known for singing "Jerusalem of Gold" (Yerushalayim Shel Zahav), written by Naomi Shemer.

Singing career
Shuli Natan's  albums feature Israeli songs, traditional Jewish melodies and songs by Shlomo Carlebach.  She achieved fame with a heartfelt rendition of "Jerusalem of Gold" in 1967. 

Her 1999 CD Open Roads includes covers of songs which were popular in Israel at the time, such as David D'Or's "Watch Over Us, Child" and Rami Kleinstein's  "Never-Ending Miracles".

Natan accompanies herself on the guitar. 

She sings Israeli songs, folk songs from around the world, Hassidic and Yiddish songs and songs of the Mizrahi Jewish community. She  sings in Hebrew, English, French, Ladino and Spanish.

Albums
Beloved Songs
Songs of Praise
Open Roads
Mostly Carlebach
1973 אנעים זמירות ושירים אארוג
1968 שירי נעמי שמר
1967 Israel Song Festival album that made Jerusalem of Gold famous

See also
Music of Israel

References

External links

Shuly Nathan by Yisrael Daliot, Jewish Women's Archive 
Jewish.songs24.de

1947 births
Living people
British emigrants to Israel
British Jews
20th-century Israeli women singers
Israeli guitarists
Women guitarists
Jewish folk singers